Digital video may refer to:
 Digital Video (DV), a digital video-tape format
 Digital is video, a type of video recording system
 Digital cinematography, the process of shooting motion pictures